The 2013 Polish Basketball Supercup was an edition of the annual super cup game in Polish basketball. This year the reigning Polish Basketball League (PLK) champions Stelmet Zielona Góra faced off against Polish Basketball Cup winners Trefl Sopot.

Match

Supercup